Sarah, Lady Acland ( Cotton; 21 July 1815 – 25 October 1878) was the wife of Sir Henry Acland, Regius Professor of Medicine at the University of Oxford.  She was a socialite and philanthropist. After her death, the Sarah Acland Home was established in her memory.

Life
Sarah Cotton was born in Leytonstone, Essex, England, the eldest daughter of William Cotton FRS (1786–1866), Governor of the Bank of England, and Sarah Lane (1790–1872). She lived with her family in Marylebone, London before she was married.

On 14 July 1846, Sarah Cotton married Sir Henry Acland; they had seven sons and a daughter:

 Admiral Sir William Alison Dyke Acland, 2nd Baronet (1847–1924)
 Sarah Angelina Acland (1849–1930), photographer
 Henry Dyke Acland (1850–1936)
 Theodore Dyke Acland (1851–1931), the father of Theodore Acland (1890–1960)
 Herbert Dyke Acland (1855–1877)
 Sir Reginald Brodie Dyke Acland (1856–1924)
 Francis Edward Dyke Acland (1857–1943)
 Alfred Dyke Acland (1858–1937)

The Aclands lived at 41 Broad Street, Oxford. They were at the centre of the social life of Oxford University.

Sarah Acland died in Oxford on 25 October 1878. She was buried in Holywell Cemetery by St Cross Church in Oxford.

Legacy
There is a memorial to Sarah Acland in Christ Church Cathedral, Oxford.

The Sarah Acland Memorial and Home for Nurses was originally established in 1882 at 37 Wellington Square, Oxford in Sarah Acland's memory. This moved to 25 Banbury Road, Oxford, in 1897 as the Sarah Acland Home and later became known as the Acland Hospital. The hospital was rebuilt in 1936 by Lord Nuffield. In 2004, the hospital moved to Headington, a suburb of east Oxford, as The Manor Hospital, managed by Nuffield Hospitals. The Banbury Road building became part of Keble College, Oxford.

Sarah Acland's only daughter and namesake, Sarah Angelina Acland was an early pioneer of colour photography. Some of her photographs are in the collection of the Museum of the History of Science in Broad Street, opposite the location of the family home.

References

1815 births
1900 deaths
People from Leytonstone
People from Oxford
People associated with the University of Oxford
Socialites from London
English women philanthropists
Women of the Victorian era
Wives of knights
19th-century English women
19th-century English nobility
Burials at Holywell Cemetery
19th-century British philanthropists
Nathaniel Cotton family
19th-century women philanthropists